Morgan Jessica LaMantia (born December 9, 1986) is an American politician and lawyer serving as a member of the Texas Senate for the 27th district.

Elections

2022
On November 22, 2021, LaMantia filed to run for the Texas Senate for District 27. LaMantia ran in a crowded field that included State Representative Alex Dominquez and lawyer Sara Stapleton-Berrera. LaMantia and Stapleton-Berrera advanced to a runoff in which LaMantia defeated Stapleton-Berrera. 

The 27th district was the only competitive district in the 2022 elections. LaMantia faced Republican Adam Hinojosa in the general. She defeated Hinojosa by a mere 659 votes, but Hinojosa requested a recount. Following the recount, LaMantia's lead expanded an additional 18 votes and Hinojosa conceded.

Tenure

Committee assignments
Education
Health and Human Services
Nominations
State Affairs

Political positions

Abortion
During her 2022 campaign, LaMantia touted her pro-abortion views. Her predecessor being a conservative anti-abortion Democrat and South Texas' socially conservative culture drew additional scrutiny to her stance.

Personal life
LaMantia lives in South Padre Island.

References

Living people
21st-century American politicians
Democratic Party Texas state senators
People from Cameron County, Texas
University of Texas at Austin alumni
St. Mary's University School of Law alumni
Women in Texas politics
21st-century American women politicians
Year of birth missing (living people)
People from Laredo, Texas
Texas lawyers
American women lawyers